The IAAF World Challenge was an annual, global circuit of one-day track and field competitions organized by the International Association of Athletics Federations (IAAF). First held in 2010, it replaced the IAAF Grand Prix and IAAF Super Grand Prix series to form the second tier of international one-day meetings, after the IAAF Diamond League. Unlike the Diamond League, the IAAF World Challenge comprised stand-alone meetings, and no overall winners are crowned. The series was made defunct at the end of 2019 and was replaced by the World Athletics Continental Tour, which includes series winners for non-Diamond League events.

Editions

The Rieti Meeting was included in the original series schedule in 2016, but was later cancelled

Meetings

Series records

Men

Women

References

External links
 IAAF website

 
Recurring sporting events established in 2010
Recurring sporting events disestablished in 2019
Annual athletics series
World Challenge
Defunct athletics competitions